The following is a list of Melbourne Football Club leading goalkickers in each season of the Australian Football League (formerly the Victorian Football League) and AFL Women's.

VFL/AFL

AFL Women's

References

 

Goalkickers
Australian rules football-related lists
Melbourne sport-related lists